Abingdon High School is a public high school located in Abingdon, Virginia, United States. The school focuses on academics while supporting extracurricular activities such as athletics, the arts, clubs and community involvement.

Academics
Abingdon offers college and career preparation courses. The school offers many Advanced Placement courses including Biology,  Chemistry, United States History, Government, English 11, English 12, and Calculus. Dual-enrollment classes are offered through the nearby Virginia Highlands Community College (VHCC). These courses include VHCC Calculus, VHCC Geology, and VHCC Computer Software. A. Linwood Holton's Governor's school offers classes in western civilization, statistics, anatomy, world civilizations and astronomy.

Extracurricular activities
The school offers student activities including athletics, band, chorus, one act theater, National Honor Society, Washington County Community Scholars, Future Farmers of America, a DECA chapter, an FBLA chapter, and a Technology Student Association chapter. The school newspaper is the Talon, the yearbook is The Beacon and the literary magazine is Wings.

Wachovia Cup
Abingdon High School has won the Central Fidelity/Wachovia Cup in Group AA Academics 15 times, setting the state record for most championships.  Abingdon won 9 consecutive championships from 1990 to 1998. The Central Fidelity/Wachovia Cup, which was started in 1989, is awarded by the Virginia High School League.

Southwest Academic Conference
Abingdon High is a member of the Southwest Academic Conference.  Its championships include:
 Science: 2002, 2005, 2007
 Social Studies: 1995, 1996, 2002, 2009, 2011
 All Around:  2001

Band
The Abingdon High School band performs both concert and marching seasons and holds the title of "The Mighty Falcon Marching Band". The band enters competitions during the fall season. One of their most recognized achievements is the "Papa Joe Smiddy" award, received in 2006 at the UVA Wise Marching Competition.

Chorus
The choir produces an annual musical production along with several concerts. Members of the choir audition to participate in all-county, all-district and all-state choirs.

Athletics
Abingdon competes in the Mountain 7 District and AAA Region 3D of the Virginia High School League. Abingdon is the 2nd Smallest AAA school. Abingdon is competitive in golf, baseball, girls basketball and girls tennis.

State championships
Volleyball: 1983
Girls Cross Country:  1988
Girls Outdoor Track & Field:  1994
Golf: 2000 2015 2017
Girls Tennis: 2017

Notable alumni
Scott Cooper (1988) – director and actor
Rick Boucher (1964) – Representative to Congress for Virginia's 9th district
Gail Harris – Former MLB player (New York Giants, Detroit Tigers)
Doug Blevins (1981) – NFL kicking coach: Jets, Patriots, Miami Dolphins, and Minnesota Vikings

References

External links
 Official web site

Public high schools in Virginia
Schools in Washington County, Virginia